Publik Khatulistiwa TV (abbrievated as PKTV), is a local television station based in Bontang, East Kalimantan, Indonesia; which owned by one of major companies in Bontang, Pupuk Kaltim, and it is one of two local TV channels in Bontang, the other one is  (owned by Badak NGL). PKTV was founded in 1998.

In 2010, PKTV obtained broadcast rights for 2010-11 season of National Basketball Association and ASEAN Basketball League, along with Jak TV and 11 other local stations. PKTV changed its logo since April 2, 2020.

References

External links
PKTV Kaltim website

Television channels and stations established in 1998
Television stations in Indonesia
1998 establishments in Indonesia